The null sign (∅) is often used in mathematics for denoting the empty set (however, the variant  is more commonly used). The same letter in linguistics represents zero, the lack of an element. It is commonly used in phonology, morphology, and syntax.

Encodings
The symbol ∅ is available at Unicode point U+2205.

Similar letters
Similar letters and symbols include the following:
Diameter sign in geometry: 
Scandinavian letter Ø: majuscule  and minuscule  are a part of the alphabet of Scandinavian languages. The minuscule letter is also used in the International Phonetic Alphabet (IPA) to represent close-mid front rounded vowel.
Greek letter Φ: majuscule  and minuscule  are a part of the Greek alphabet. The  is used in the IPA for voiceless bilabial fricative.
Greek letter Θ: majuscule  and minuscule  are a part of the Greek alphabet. The minuscule is used in the IPA for voiceless dental fricative.
Cyrillic letter Ө: majuscule  and minuscule  are a part of the Cyrillic script. It is used in the IPA for close-mid central rounded vowel.
Cyrillic letter Ф: majuscule  and minuscule  are a part of the Cyrillic script. The letter took the place of fita ( and ), a letter of Early Cyrillic alphabet in modern usages.

Use in mathematics
In mathematics, the null sign (∅) denotes the empty set. Note that a null set is not necessarily an empty set. Common notations for the empty set include "{}", "∅", and "". The latter two symbols were introduced by the Bourbaki group (specifically André Weil) in 1939, inspired by the letter Ø in the Danish and Norwegian alphabets (and not related in any way to the Greek letter Φ).

Empty sets are used in set operations. For example:

There are no common elements in the solution; so it should be denoted as:
 or

Use in linguistics

In linguistics, the null sign is used to indicate the absence of an element, such as a phoneme or morpheme.

Morphology
The English language was a fusional language, this means the language makes use of inflectional changes to convey grammatical meanings. Although the inflectional complexity of English has been largely reduced in the course of development, the inflectional endings can be seen in earlier forms of English, such as the Early Modern English (abbreviated as EModE).

The verb endings of EModE was summarised in the table below by Roger Lass:

References

Mathematical symbols